Bishunpur Basant is a Gram panchayat in hajipur, vaishali district, bihar.

Geography
This panchayat is located at

Panchayat office Vishnupur Titidha subhai

Nearest City/Town
Hajipur (Distance KM)

Nearest major road highway or river
SH 49 ( state highway 49)

Compass

Villages in panchayat
The following villages are in this panchayat:

References 

Gram panchayats in Bihar
Villages in Vaishali district
Vaishali district
Hajipur